Smith O'Brien's GAA  is a Gaelic Athletic Association club located in the parish of Killaloe, County Clare in Ireland. The club field teams in hurling  competitions. The club won the first ever Clare senior hurling championship in 1887.

Smith O’Brien’s won the 2004 Clare Intermediate hurling championship, beating favourites Clooney Quin in a replay. After a 9 year stint at senior level, the side were relegated to Intermediate in 2013.

On the 31st of October 2021, 17 years to the day since they won their 2004 title, Smith O’Briens won the Intermediate championship once again - going unbeaten through their 6 championship games. Supported by a contingent of players from the 2013 relegated side and two players from the 2004 winning side, they beat favourites St. Joseph’s Doora-barefield. Overcoming a 0-7 to 0-1 deficit after 15 mins, Smith O’Briens trailed the St. Joseph’s side until the 61st minute, taking their first lead of the game in injury time before eventually winning on a score line of 0-14 to 0-12. On their path to victory they overcame Tulla, Tubber (QF) and Tulla again in the semi final before beating St. Joseph’s in  final. The Smith O’Briens outfit were bookmaker underdogs for each game. The outfit was managed and coached by 26 year old, Tony Gleeson.

The club are named after William Smith O'Brien, an Irish Nationalist and Member of Parliament (MP) and leader of the Young Ireland movement who died in 1864.

Club Officers History:
Club Chairman: Patrick Aherne (2021–present)
Club Secretary: Frank Tucker (2021-2022),Tony O'Brien (???-2021)
Club Treasurer: Declan O’Halloran (2020-2022)
Public relations Officer: Nicole Foley (2020–Present)

Major honours
 Clare Senior Hurling Championship (1): 1887
 Clare Intermediate Hurling Championship (2): 2004, 2021 
 Clare Junior A Hurling Championship (3): 1967, 1978, 1997

References

External links
Official Site

Gaelic games clubs in County Clare
Hurling clubs in County Clare